Spink is a small village in County Laois, Ireland. It is situated near the  Kilkenny border on the R430 regional road.

Sports
Spink GAA is the local Gaelic Athletic Association club.

Dispute
Residents from Spink are members of the prominent protest group, "Ratheniska, Timahoe, Spink (RTS) Substation Action Group" who have prevented the Electricity Supply Board from developing the power station in Coolnabacca, Ratheniska in a campaign that has been ongoing since 2009. In 2021, the ESB and the community group "hardened positions", and the ESB advised that if an offer of mediation from ESB and EirGrid, ″is not accepted by 27 August 2021, ESB and EirGrid will have no option but to consider its legal remedies against the Group.″ The group are concerned that the power station will be used to source power for all over the midlands and will have a significant impact on the local area.

See also
 List of towns and villages in Ireland

References

Towns and villages in County Laois
Articles on towns and villages in Ireland possibly missing Irish place names